XHNNO-FM is a radio station in Naco, Sonora, serving Agua Prieta, Sonora, Mexico. Broadcasting on 99.9 FM, XHNNO is owned by Grupo Radiofónico ZER and known as Los 40.

History
The concession for XHNNO was awarded on November 23, 1994. The station has always been owned by Rodríguez Zermeño.

Until January 2021, the station carried the Exa FM pop format from MVS Radio.

The station began carrying the Los 40 format on February 3, 2021.

References

Radio stations in Sonora